Menudo Mix is a mixtape of classic and remixed songs compiled from the Latino Velvet and N2Deep music catalogs, as well as the members, Jay Tee, Baby Beesh,  Frost & Don Cisco, own solo projects and guest appearances. The last two tracks, "Life is Like… " and "Bay Area Factors" are bonus tracks and were previously unreleased.

Critical reception 

Allmusic - "...Menudo Mix...is uncut West Coast hip-hop...clean, compressed production...sizzling-hot tracks together with their memorable hooks...this all-star group delivers on its reputation. From the first to the last track, Latino Velvet grimace, flex, and boast. From the architects of the style, there are few voices as bold and authoritative."

Track listing

References

External links 
 Menudo Mix at 40 Ounce Records
 [ Menudo Mix] at Allmusic
 Menudo Mix at Tower Records

Latino Velvet albums
Baby Bash albums
Don Cisco albums
Jay Tee albums
Gangsta rap compilation albums
2004 mixtape albums
2004 compilation albums